The 2005–06 Coppa Italia was the 59th edition of the Italian football tournament. For the second consecutive season, Roma and Internazionale were the finalists. Inter won the tournament by a score of 4–1 aggregate in the final. It started on August 7, 2005 and ended on May 11, 2006.

First round

|}

Second round

|}

Third round

|}

Knockout stage

Final

First leg

Second leg

Internazionale won 4–2 on aggregate.

Top goalscorers

References

rsssf.com

2005-06
Italy
Coppa Italia